The Ghimbășel (also Ghimbav) is a left tributary of the river Bârsa in Romania. Its source is in the northern part of the Bucegi Mountains. Originally it discharged directly into the Olt, but much of its flow has been diverted into the Bârsa, another tributary of the Olt, near Colonia Bod. The former lower course of the Ghimbășel, downstream of this diversion, still exists and is used for the discharge of local inflows. It flows into the Olt north of Bod.

Tributaries

The following rivers are tributaries to the river Ghimbășel:

Left: Valea Glăjăriei
Right: Năjila, Pârâul Mic, Valea Cetății, Valea Joaderului, Canalul Timiș, Timiș, Durbav

References

Rivers of Romania
Rivers of Brașov County